Lily Collins is an English-American actress. She made her acting debut in the sitcom Growing Pains.

She appeared in leading roles in the sci-fi action-horror film Priest (2011) and the fantasy Mirror Mirror (2012) in the role of Snow White. In 2013, starred in the role of Clary Fray in the fantasy The Mortal Instruments: City of Bones, for which she was nominated for the Teen Choice Award for Choice Movie Actress – Action and an MTV Movie Award. In 2016, she was nominated for a Golden Globe Award for her role as Marla Mabrey in Rules Don't Apply. She starred as Fantine in the BBC miniseries adaptation of Les Misérables (2018–2019), and in 2019 appeared in two biographical films, the Netflix drama Extremely Wicked, Shockingly Evil and Vile, and as Edith Tolkien in Tolkien.

Film

Television

Music videos

References

External links
Lily Collins at the Internet Movie Database

Actress filmographies
American filmographies
British filmographies